Jung Myung-oh (born 29 October 1986) is a South Korea professional footballer who plays as a defensive midfielder or centre-back.

External links

1986 births
Living people
Association football midfielders
South Korean footballers
Gyeongnam FC players
Jeonnam Dragons players
Suwon FC players
Jung Myung-oh
Jung Myung-oh
Jung Myung-oh
K League 1 players
K League 2 players
Korea National League players
Jung Myung-oh
South Korean expatriate footballers
South Korean expatriate sportspeople in Thailand
Expatriate footballers in Thailand